The interosseous recurrent artery (or recurrent interosseous artery) is an artery of the forearm which arises from the posterior interosseous artery near its origin.  It ascends to the interval between the lateral epicondyle and olecranon, on or through the fibers of the supinator but beneath the anconeus. It anastomoses with the middle collateral artery.

References 

Arteries of the upper limb